Nowotaski may refer to:

Places
 Nowy Targ (disambiguation), from its adjectival form
 Nowy Targ County, aka Nowotarski County, in Podhale, Lesser Poland, Poland

People
 Antal Nowotarski (1825–1901), Hungarian botanist; see List of Hungarian botanists
 Bernie Nowotarski, an American football coach and GM for the indoor gridiron football team Harrisburg Stampede
 Casimir Nowotarski, a soccer player for FC Gueugnon
 Jakub Nowotarski, the developer of quantile regression averaging
 Natalie Nowotarski, Australian photographer who was a finalist for National Photographic Portrait Prize

See also